Audley Urban District is a former administrative unit in Staffordshire created by the Local Government Act 1894. It contained the civil parish of Audley. In 1932 it was abolished, being absorbed into the  Newcastle-under-Lyme Municipal Borough, Newcastle-under-Lyme Rural District and Kidsgrove Urban District.

References 

Districts of England created by the Local Government Act 1894
Borough of Newcastle-under-Lyme
History of Staffordshire
Local government in Staffordshire
Urban districts of England